Daniela Rupp (born 9 May 1986) is a Swiss curler.

At the national level, she is a 2015 Swiss women's bronze medallist and a 2019 Swiss mixed doubles champion curler.

Teams

Women's

Mixed

Mixed doubles

References

External links 

 
 Daniela Rupp | Baumeler Reisen, weltweite Wanderferien, Veloferien, Trekking, Bikeferien, Kreativferien

Living people
1986 births
Swiss female curlers
Swiss curling champions